Anil Bhattacharjee (born 1 August 1934) is an Indian former cricketer. He played 23 first-class matches for Bengal between 1953 and 1961.

See also
 List of Bengal cricketers

References

External links
 

1934 births
Living people
Indian cricketers
Bengal cricketers
People from Murshidabad district